Justin Michael Jaynes (born August 10, 1989) is an American mixed martial artist who competes in the  Featherweight and Lightweight  divisions. A professional since 2008, he most notably competed in the Ultimate Fighting Championship (UFC). He is the former Warrior Xtreme Cagefighting (WXC) Lightweight champion. His family includes his son Benjamin, his sister named Melissa and his niece and nephew Addyson and collin

Background
Jaynes was born and grew up in Richmond, Michigan. Jaynes attended Richmond High School, graduating in 2007. In his senior year, Jaynes placed second at the 2007 Michigan High School state wrestling tournament, losing to Drakkar Klose in the finals. Jaynes then continued his wrestling career at Olivet College, from where he graduated with Bachelor's degree in Sport and Fitness Management.

Mixed martial arts career

Early career
With mixed martial arts in its early phases in Michigan, Jaynes fought 47 amateur bouts around the state before turning pro in 2013.

Jaynes fought in various regional circuits and fought multiple times overseas. He also made one appearance in Bellator. Jaynes won the WXC Lightweight title and made one successful defense before leaving for the UFC.

Ultimate Fighting Championship
After a cornerman for Matt Frevola tested positive for COVID-19, Jaynes stepped in to fight Frank Camacho on three days notice. At the weigh-ins, Camacho weighed in at 158 pounds, 2 pounds over the allotted non-title lightweight limit of 156 pounds. The bout proceeded as a catchweight and Camacho was fined 20 percent of his purse which went to Jaynes. Jaynes won the fight via knockout in the first round. This win earned him the Performance of the Night award.

Jaynes faced Gavin Tucker at UFC Fight Night 174. He lost the fight via rear-naked choke in round three.

Jaynes was scheduled to face Gabriel Benítez on November 14, 2020 at UFC Fight Night: Felder vs. dos Anjos. The fight was canceled after Benítez tested positive for COVID-19.  The pairing was left intact and eventually took place on December 5, 2020 at UFC on ESPN 19. He lost the fight via technical knockout in the first round.

Jaynes faced Devonte Smith on February 6, 2021 at UFC Fight Night: Overeem vs. Volkov. He lost the fight via technical knockout due to a doctor stoppage in round two.

Jayne faced Charles Rosa on June 26, 2021 at UFC Fight Night 190. Jaynes made waves across the internet as he announced before his fight that he was betting close to $25,000 on himself to win his fight. He lost the fight via split decision. Subsequently, he tested positive for marijuana and was suspended for four-and-a-half months by NSAC, making him eligible to return to competition on November 9, 2021.

In August 2021, Jaynes was released from the UFC.

Post UFC 
In his first bout since his release from the UFC, Jaynes faced Carl Deaton III for the TWC Lightweight Championship at Total Warrior Combat: Unfinished Business on February 5, 2022. He lost the bout via uanimous decision.

Personal life 
Jaynes is a coach at Xtreme Couture Mixed Martial Arts in Las Vegas. He has a son named Benjamin (born 2009).

Championships and accomplishments
Ultimate Fighting Championship
Performance of the Night (One time)    

Warrior Xtreme Cagefighting
 'Warrior Xtreme Cagefighting Lightweight Champion

Mixed martial arts record 
 

|-
|Loss
|align=center|16–9
|Carl Deaton III
|Decision (unanimous)
|Total Warrior Combat: Unfinished Business
|
|align=center|3
|align=center|5:00
|Lansing, Michigan, United States
|
|-
|Loss
|align=center|16–8
|Charles Rosa
|Decision (split)
|UFC Fight Night: Gane vs. Volkov
|
|align=center|3
|align=center|5:00
|Las Vegas, Nevada, United States
|
|-
|Loss
|align=center|16–7
|Devonte Smith
|TKO (doctor stoppage)
|UFC Fight Night: Overeem vs. Volkov
|
|align=center|2
|align=center|3:38
|Las Vegas, Nevada, United States
|
|-
|Loss
|align=center|16–6
|Gabriel Benítez
|TKO (knee to the body and elbows)
|UFC on ESPN: Hermansson vs. Vettori
|
|align=center|1
|align=center|4:06
|Las Vegas, Nevada, United States
|
|-
|Loss
|align=center| 16–5
|Gavin Tucker
|Submission (rear-naked choke)
|UFC Fight Night: Lewis vs. Oleinik
|
|align=center|3
|align=center|1:43
|Las Vegas, Nevada, United States
|
|-
|Win
|align=center|16–4
|Frank Camacho
|TKO (punches)
|UFC on ESPN: Blaydes vs. Volkov
|
|align=center|1
|align=center|0:41
|Las Vegas, Nevada, United States
|
|-
|Win
|align=center|15–4
|James Warfield-Lane
|TKO (punches)
|WXC 78: Warrior Wednesday 3
|
|align=center|1
|align=center|2:05
|Southgate, Michigan, United States
|
|-
|Win
|align=center|14–4
|Brandon Noble 
|Submission (guillotine choke)
|WXC 75: Night of Champions 11
|
|align=center|1
|align=center|3:59
|Southgate, Michigan, United States
|
|-
|Win
|align=center|13–4
|Deven Brown
|Submission (guillotine choke)
|WXC 72: Inferno 
|
|align=center|1
|align=center|1:31
|Southgate, Michigan, United States
|
|-
|Win
|align=center|12–4
|Abdul Sami Wali
|DQ (fence grabbing)
|SFL 2018
|
|align=center|1
|align=center|4:21
|Mumbai, India
|
|-
|Loss
|align=center|11–4
|Tommy Aaron 
|Decision (unanimous)
|Rumble on the Water 3
|
|align=center|3
|align=center|5:00
|Long Beach, California, United States
|
|-
|Win
|align=center|11–3
|Jacob Rosales 
|Submission (guillotine choke) 
|FCOC 46
|
|align=center|2
|align=center|5:00
|Costa Mesa, California, United States
|
|-
|Win
|align=center|10–3
|Troy Lamson
|Decision (unanimous)
|Total Warrior Combat 
|
|align=center|5
|align=center|5:00
|Lansing, Michigan, United States
|
|-
|Win
|align=center|9–3
|Chase Caldwell
|TKO (doctor stoppage)
|XFS: Payback 
|
|align=center|1
|align=center|1:42
|Valley Center, California, United States
|
|-
|Win
|align=center|8–3
|Marcus Lamarr 
|TKO (punches)
|XFS: Heat
|
|align=center|1
|align=center|0:52
|Valley Center, California, United States
|
|-
|Win
|align=center|7–3
|Erick Lozano 
|Decision (unanimous)
|Big John’s MMA
|
|align=center|3
|align=center|5:00
|Manistee, Michigan, United States
|
|-
|Loss
|align=center|6–3
|Jesse Gross
|Decision (split)
|Provincial FC 3
|
|align=center|3
|align=center|5:00
|London, Ontario, Canada
|
|-
|Win
|align=center|6–2
|Ruben Baraiac
|TKO (punches)
|Bellator 124
|
|align=center|1
|align=center|4:17
|Plymouth Township, Michigan, United States
|
|-
|Loss
|align=center|5–2
|Jimmy Spicuzza
|Decision (unanimous)
|WSOF 10: Branch vs. Taylor
|
|align=center|3
|align=center|5:00
|Las Vegas, Nevada, United States
|
|-
|Win
|align=center|5–1
|John Schultz
|TKO (punches)
|TWC Pro Series 
|
|align=center|1
|align=center|4:54
|Lansing, Michigan, United States
|
|-
|Win
|align=center|4–1
|Andrew Hellner
|Submission (rear-naked choke)
|TXC Legends 2
|
|align=center|2
|align=center|2:48
|Mt. Clemens, Michigan, United States
|
|-
|Loss
|align=center|3–1
|Robby Ostovich
|Decision (unanimous)
|Destiny MMA
|
|align=center|3
|align=center|5:00
|Honolulu, Hawaii, United States
|
|-
|Win
|align=center|3–0
|Mickey Miller
|Submission 
|Rage in the Cage 2
|
|align=center|1
|align=center|1:30
|Paisley, Scotland
|
|-
|Win
|align=center|2–0
|Justin Zeno
|KO (punches)
|TWC Pro Series 18
|
|align=center|1
|align=center|0:35
|Lansing, Michigan, United States
|
|-
|Win
|align=center|1–0
|Rick Ogden 
|Submission (rear-naked choke)
|Big John’s MMA
|
|align=center|1
|align=center|1:09
|Sault Ste. Marie, Michigan, United States
|
|-

See also 
 List of male mixed martial artists

References

External links
 
 

1989 births
Living people
Olivet Comets wrestlers
American male mixed martial artists
Ultimate Fighting Championship male fighters
Lightweight mixed martial artists
Mixed martial artists utilizing collegiate wrestling
Mixed martial artists utilizing Brazilian jiu-jitsu
American practitioners of Brazilian jiu-jitsu